Tristesse de la Lune (French: "Sadness of the Moon") was an electropop group founded by German musicians Kati Roloff and Gini Martin after they left Blutengel in 2002. Their songs typically have romantic lyrics and draw inspiration from their personal lives or books as well as movies. They carried over their previous contracts with Blutengel's label Out of Line Music.

Kati was no longer part of Tristesse de la Lune as of December 15th 2006. Gini continued into 2007 and had recorded six songs for a new album. A previously unreleased track "Erinnerung" was released on Out of Line Music compilation "Machineries of Joy Volume 5" in 2012.

Discography 
 Strangeland, 2002 (Promo)
 Eiskalte Liebe, 2002 (Maxi) – feat. Hocico-singer Erk Aicrag
 Queen of the Damned (Maxi) (2003)
 A Heart Whose Love Is Innocent, 2003
 Ninive/Time Is Moving, 2005 (Maxi)
 Limited Edition tracks / tracks on compilations (Selection):
 "Dein Licht" on "Machineries of Joy Volume 2" Compilation CD (2002)
 "Queen Of The Damned (Rough Mix)" on Advanced Electronics Vol. 2 Compilation CD (2003)
 "Soulhunter" on "Machineries of Joy Volume 3" Compilation CD (2004)
 "Let's Pretend" on "Machineries of Joy Volume 4" Compilation CD (2007)
 "Erinnerung" on "Machineries of Joy Volume 5" Compilation CD (2012)

External links 
 Official Website
 Tristesse De La Lune on Discogs
 Official Myspace
 Dark-Romantic-Electro – Tristesse De La Lune (Out of line Label info)

References 

All-female bands
German pop music groups